The article contains information about the 2013–14 Iran 3rd Division football season. This is the 4th rated football league in Iran after the Persian Gulf Cup, Azadegan League, and 2nd Division. The league started from September 2013.

In total and in the first round, 60 teams will compete in 5 different groups of 12. From the first round, 10 teams (2 from each group) go through the second round. In the second round 10 teams from 1st round and 14 temas from previous season (8 teams relegated from 2nd division + 1 team relegated from 1st division + 5 top teams from 3rd division) will be divided into 2 groups of 12, where the winner and runner-up of each group will be directly promoted to 2014–15 Iran Football's 2nd Division. The two group runner-up will go through play-off matches, where the play-off winner also will be promoted. Therefore, in total, five team will be promoted from this league to Iran Football's 2nd Division.

Teams
The following 72 teams will compete in 2012–13 Iran Football's 3rd Division season.

Alborz Shahrdari Zanjan
Amir Kabir Shazand Arak
Azar Kowsar Tabriz
Bam Mashhad o Reza
Bargh Urumia
Bazargani Bahadori Kovar
Caspian Chaloosh
Daam & Toyour Ravansar
Dorost Karan Moghan 
Ekbatan Kowsar Tehran
Ettehad Andimeshk
Esteghlal B Tehran
Esteghlal Jonub Tehran
Esteghlal Molasani
Esteghlal Novin Qazvin
Esteghlal Qaemshahr
Farhang Ramhormoz
Gahar Novin Dorud
Grand Khorasan
Helal Ahmar Gerash
Helal Ahmar Ilam
Hermas Tabriz
Iranjavan Khoormooj Bushehr
Khalkhal Dasht Ardebil
Khazar Mahmoudabad
Khoone Be Khooneh Amir Kala
Mahtab Baft Shaft
Mes Novin Kerman
Novin Noforest Birjand
Oghab Tehran
Oghab Gonbad Kavoos
Omran Karan Ardebil
Panah Afarin Qom
Pars Football Chaloos
Patu Laleh Isfahan
Perspolis Zahedan
Piroozi Garmsar
Piruzi Kamyaran
Rahpooyan Rezvanshahr
Sadat Dehdasht
Salsal Lisar Talesh
Shahed Firooz Abad
Shahin Karaj
Shahin Kuhrang Shahrekord   
Shahrdari Bam
Shahrdari Baneh
Shahrdari Hamedan
Shahrdari Lahijan
Shahrdari Mahshahr
Shahrdari Naghadeh
Shahrdari Nazarabad
Shahrdari Novin Bandar Abbas
Shahrdari Semnan
Shohada Arteshe Isfahan
Shohada Sari
Tohid Bushehr
Vahdat Khavaran Birjand
Zagros Bamaei
Zob Ahan Novin
Zob Felezat Alvand Bahar Hamedan
Ashian Gostaran Varamin
Chooka Talesh
Dartak Lorestan
Datis Lorestan
Mes Shahr-e Babak
Moghavemat Tehran
Naftoon Tehran
Omid Hassanabad
Sadra Neka
Saipa Mehr Karaj 
Shahrdari Behshahr        
Yadavaran Shalamcheh

First round (standings)

Group 1

Group 2

Group 3

Group 4

Group 5

Second round

Group A

Group B

References 

 برنامه و نتایج هفتگی لیگ دسته سوم

League 3 (Iran) seasons
4